The 1906–07 season was Manchester City F.C.'s sixteenth season of league football and fourth consecutive season in the top flight of English football.

Following City's punishment for the awarding of players bonuses, then a misdemeanour in the FA regulations, the club was forced to start half from scratch for the 06–07 season, and in the first four games alone ten players made their club debut, with another six players donning the shirt for the first time over the course of the season. Consequently, the club's previously strong league form suffered a huge hit and the club struggled to a 17th-place finish, a full 12 places lower than their previous finish and five points off relegation.

Of note was that the first game of this season is believed to have been played under the highest temperature recorded in English football - 90 degrees Fahrenheit (32.2 °C). By the end of the game, City had only six players left on the pitch - five others had had to leave the field of play suffering from heat exhaustion.

Team Kit

Football League First Division

Results summary

Reports

FA Cup

Squad statistics

Squad
Appearances for competitive matches only

Scorers

All

League

FA Cup

See also
Manchester City F.C. seasons

References

External links
Extensive Manchester City statistics site

1906-07
English football clubs 1906–07 season